The 1928–29 season was Stoke City's 29th season in the Football League and the ninth in the Second Division.

There were no major signings in 1928–29 as the club decided to change a number of policies regarding players' contracts in order to avoid a repeat of the scenes at the end of the 1923–24 season. Mather also brought in a number of players from the club's reserve and youth teams as the squad held a solid defence and with only 51 goals conceded Stoke had the best defensive record in the top two divisions. Stoke finished the season in sixth place which the fans thought they could have done better considering their defensive qualities.

Season review

League
The Stoke board acquired the freehold of the Victoria Ground in the summer of 1928, but decided against any major signings for the 1928–29 campaign, as young players were slowly being introduced into the first team and reserve side. After some of the players' actions of 1924, chairman Sherwin along with the board and manager decided to sort out the respective salaries of their professional players in order to avoid any further problems.

Stoke had a solid look to their squad and they started the season in perfect fashion beating Nottingham Forest 5–1 on the opening day of the season at a stunned City Ground. Stoke's good form continued and by the end of October the team was in a good position to mount a promotion challenge. However they won just one match in November and December and although they did pick up in the new year Stoke were unable to challenge for a promotion spot and finished the season in sixth place. Some supporters felt the team should have done better, especially as they had the best defensive record outside the First Division. Fans were also disappointed at the sale of favourite Harry Davies to Huddersfield Town, he would later return to the club in 1931.

FA Cup
Arsenal knocked Stoke out of the FA Cup for the second season running this time in the third round.

Final league table

Results
Stoke's score comes first

Legend

Football League Second Division

FA Cup

Squad statistics

References

Stoke City F.C. seasons
Stoke